Kanin may refer to:

Geography
Kanin Peninsula, in northwestern Russia
Kanin (mountain), a mountain on the border of Slovenia and Italy
Kanin, Pomeranian Voivodeship, a village in Poland
Kanin, West Pomeranian Voivodeship, a village in Poland

People with the surname
Ethan Kanin
Fay Kanin
Garson Kanin

See also
Prince Kan'in Kotohito